Marius Grout (born 8 November 1903 Fauville-en-Caux – 1 May 1946 Le Havre) was a French writer and poet.

Life 
His father was a postman in St. Saire near Neufchâtel-en-Bray. He chose teaching. In 1932, he joined the Religious Society of Friends.

In the late 1930s, he befriended a group of writers, which included Emile Danoën and his former pupil Pierre Aubery.

In 1937 he published his first book, Kagawa, through the Society of Friends. He won the Prix Goncourt in 1943 for his novel Passage of rights.

He died at Le Havre and was buried in Incheville.

A school is named after him in Rouen, a school in Montivilliers, and the Primary School in Saint-Saire.

Works
 Kagawa, biographie, 1937
 Le Poète et le Saint, essai, 1938
 Le Déluge, théâtre, 1939
 Musique d’Avent, Paris, Gallimard, 1941
 Mysticisme et poésie, Paris, Albin Michel, 1942
 Le vent se lève, Paris, Gallimard, 1942
 Passage de l'homme, Paris, Gallimard, 1943, Gallimard, Prix Goncourt
 Translated in English, by Emerson Lamb et published with an introduction by Henry Van Etten for Vantage Press, New York, 1962, When the man passed by.
 Poèmes, Paris, Gallimard, 1944
 Un Homme perdu, Paris, Gallimard, 1945
 Poèmes à l’inconnue, Paris, Le Seuil, 1945
 À un Jeune Poète, Paris, Éditions du Pavois, 1945
 Kagawa, le Gandhi japonais, Préf. de Toyohiko Kagawa (en), Paris, Presses d’Île-de-France, 1946

Bibliography 
 Georges Hirondel, Marius Grout: Prix Goncourt 1943: aventurier de l’absolu, Luneray, Bertout,
 Georges Hirondel, Marius Grout : Ecrivain de l’absolu – Essai d'une "revie" littéraire, Thèse à la carte A.N.R.T,

1903 births
1946 deaths
People from Seine-Maritime
Writers from Normandy
Prix Goncourt winners
French male writers
20th-century French male writers